This article provides details of international football games played by the North Korea national football team from 2020 to present.

Fixtures and results

2021

References

Football in North Korea
2020
2020s in North Korean sport